Tidworth Camp is a military installation at Tidworth in Wiltshire, England.  It forms part of the Tidworth, Netheravon and Bulford (TidNBul) Garrison.

History
The Camp was established when the War Office acquired a 19th-century mansion – Tedworth House – and large tracts of land to its north in 1897. Headquarters Southern Command was established at Tidworth Camp in 1905.

Lucknow Barracks and Mooltan Barracks were completed in 1905, Tidworth Military Hospital was finished in 1907. Aliwal Barracks, Assaye Barracks, Bhurtpore Barracks, Candahar Barracks, Delhi Barracks and Jellalabad Barracks were added later, and a Royal Ordnance depot was established during the First World War. The barracks are named for battles in India and Afghanistan: Aliwal, Assaye, Bhurtpore, Candahar, Delhi, Jellalabad, Lucknow and Mooltan. (Jellalabad Barracks should not be confused with the former barracks of the same name in Taunton, Somerset).

There was also an army hospital during the First World War. A description of it, including actions taken to address a suspected meningitis outbreak, is provided by Arthur Bullock, who spent around a week there in 1918.

In the Second World War, the Camp was home from 1942 to 1944 to various formations of the United States Army including 7th Armored Division (14 June to 7 August 1944), 9th Armored Division, and 8th Armored Division. HQ Southern Command left the Camp and moved to Erskine Barracks near Fugglestone St Peter in 1949. The military hospital closed in March 1977.

Extensive reconstruction at the Camp involving 160 new or refurbished buildings was carried out under Project Allenby Connaught between 2006 and 2014.

Tedworth House had various military uses, including providing accommodation for nurses; from 1977 to 2011 it was the Officers' Mess for the Camp. It is now a recovery centre operated by the Help for Heroes charity.

Military cemetery 
Tidworth Military Cemetery, north of the Camp and surrounded by farmland, is under the care of the Commonwealth War Graves Commission. 417 First World War burials from Tidworth, and from Fargo Military Hospital near Larkhill, include many of Australian or New Zealand servicemen. There are also 106 graves of the Second World War and 40 of other nationalities.

Former branch railway 
A branch from the Midland and South Western Junction Railway at Ludgershall was built in 1901 and opened to passengers in 1902. Goods tracks known as Tidworth Military Railway continued west from Tidworth station into the military area. The branch returned to military control in 1955 and was closed in 1963.

Barracks 
The barracks which encompass the camp include:

 Aliwal Barracks
 King's Royal Hussars
 Royal Tank Regiment
 Assaye Barracks
Queen's Royal Hussars
 4th Armoured Medical Regiment, Royal Army Medical Corps
3rd Armoured Close Support Battalion, Royal Electrical and Mechanical Engineers
 Bhurtpore Barracks
1st Armoured Medical Regiment, Royal Army Medical Corps
 Candahar Barracks
10 Army Education Centre Group, Adjutant General's Corps
Delhi Barracks
Headquarters, 1st Armoured Infantry Brigade
Headquarters, 1st Artillery Brigade
6th Armoured Close Support Battalion, Royal Electrical and Mechanical Engineers
Jellalabad Barracks
Headquarters South West
4th Armoured Close Support Battalion, Royal Electrical and Mechanical Engineers
Lucknow Barracks
1st Battalion, Royal Welsh
British Army Bands Tidworth
Band of the Royal Artillery
Band of the Corps of Royal Engineers
Band of the Adjutant General's Corps
Mooltan Barracks
1st Battalion, Royal Regiment of Fusiliers
Prince Philip Lines
 5th Force Support Battalion, Royal Electrical and Mechanical Engineers

References

Installations of the British Army
Barracks in England
Military history of Wiltshire
Tidworth